was a  after Hōki and before Enryaku. This period lasted from January 781 through August 782.

Change of era
 24 October 781 : The new era name was created to mark an event or series of events. The previous era ended and the new one commenced in Hōki  12,  on the 1st day of the 1st month of 781.

Events of the Ten'ō era
 22 December 781 (Ten'ō 1, 3rd day of the 12th month):  In 11th year of  the reign of Emperor Kōnin's reign (光仁天皇11年), he abdicated; and the succession (the senso) was received by his son. Shortly thereafter, Emperor Kammu is said to have acceded to the throne (sokui).

Notes

References
 Brown, Delmer M. and Ichirō Ishida, eds. (1979).  Gukanshō: The Future and the Past. Berkeley: University of California Press. ;  OCLC 251325323
 Nussbaum, Louis-Frédéric and Käthe Roth. (2005).  Japan encyclopedia. Cambridge: Harvard University Press. ;  OCLC 58053128
 Titsingh, Isaac. (1834). Nihon Odai Ichiran; ou,  Annales des empereurs du Japon.  Paris: Royal Asiatic Society, Oriental Translation Fund of Great Britain and Ireland. OCLC 5850691
 Varley, H. Paul. (1980). A Chronicle of Gods and Sovereigns: Jinnō Shōtōki of Kitabatake Chikafusa. New York: Columbia University Press. ;  OCLC 6042764

External links 
 National Diet Library, "The Japanese Calendar" -- historical overview plus illustrative images from library's collection

Japanese eras
8th century in Japan
781 beginnings
782 endings